Ryan S. Boschetti (born October 7, 1981) is a former American football defensive end. He was signed by the Washington Redskins as an undrafted free agent in 2004. He played college football for the College of San Mateo Bulldogs and later for UCLA.

Boschetti was also a member of the New York Sentinels, Oakland Raiders, and Las Vegas Locomotives.

Early years
Boschetti attended Carlmont High School where he lettered three years in football and was named first-team all-league, all-county and all-state as a defensive lineman. He recorded 21 career quarterback sacks. He served as captain in football, basketball, and baseball. He also earned two track letters. He was named Carlmont's Athlete of the Year in football, basketball and baseball as a senior in 1999.

College career

San Mateo
Boschetti played two seasons, 2000 and 2001, of junior college football at College of San Mateo. He was rated No. 2 junior college player in the nation by JCFootball.com and was credited with 24 quarterback sacks during his two seasons at San Mateo.  He was also two-time all-league and all-state selection.

UCLA
As a junior at UCLA, he recorded 23 tackles on the season to rank fourth among Bruin defensive lineman.  He played in all 13 games as a senior in 2003 and finished the season eighth in tackles for the Bruins with 43 tackles, 2.5 sacks, 8 tackles for loss, and a blocked kick.

Professional career

Washington Redskins
In 2004, Boschetti spent training camp with the Redskins but was released prior to the start of the regular season. He was immediately signed to the team's practice squad. On November 26, he was signed to the active roster and played in three games, recording five tackles. In 2005, he played in 13 games with 5 tackles.

He was released by the Redskins on August 30, 2008, and re-signed on November 25 after the team released running back Shaun Alexander.

Oakland Raiders
Boschetti signed with the Oakland Raiders on April 2, 2009. He was released on September 5.

Boschetti signed a contract with the Oakland Raiders on May 17, 2010. He was released on July 29

External links
 Just Sports Stats
 UCLA Bruins bio

1981 births
Living people
Players of American football from California
American football defensive tackles
American football defensive ends
UCLA Bruins football players
Washington Redskins players
Oakland Raiders players
New York Sentinels players
Hartford Colonials players
Las Vegas Locomotives players
People from Belmont, California
Sportspeople from the San Francisco Bay Area